The Ukrainian Figure Skating Championships are held annually to determine the national figure skating champions of Ukraine. Medals may be awarded in the disciplines of men's singles, ladies' singles, pair skating, and ice dancing. The senior event takes place most often in December and the junior event in January or February. In the 2013–14 season, the senior nationals were combined with an international competition, the Ukrainian Open.

Senior medalists

Men

Ladies

Pairs

Ice dancing

Junior medalists

Men

Ladies

Pairs

Ice dancing

Youth medalists

Men

Ladies

Pairs

Ice dancing

References

External links
 Ukrainian Figure Skating Federation 
 Figure skating in Ukraine

 
Figure skating national championships
Figure skating in Ukraine
Figure skating